Live at the Blue Note is the title of a live album released by the Cuban jazz ensemble Paquito D'Rivera Quintet (Paquito D'Rivera, Dari Eskenazi, Diego Urcola, and Mark Walker) on April 18, 2000. The album earned the Latin Grammy Award for Best Latin Jazz Album in 2001.

Track listing
The track listing from Allmusic.

Credits
Paquito d'Rivera - Clarinet, Composer, Primary Artist, Sax (Alto), Sax (Soprano)
Maurício Einhorn - Composer
Dario Eskenazi - Composer, Piano
Lou Gimenez - Sound Editing
Jack Kreisberg - Producer
Oriente Lopez - Composer, Flute
César Camargo Mariano - Composer
Steve Remote - Recording Engineer, Mixing Engineer
Pernell Saturnino - Percussion
Oscar Stagnaro - Bass
Diego Urcola - Composer, Trumpet
Mark Walker - Drums

References

2000 live albums
Half Note Records live albums
Latin Grammy Award for Best Latin Jazz Album
Paquito D'Rivera live albums
Albums recorded at the Blue Note Jazz Club